Andrei Vasilyevich Shabanov (born 29 October 1976 in Sverdlovsk) is a former Russian football and futsal player.

After ending his professional football career at the age of 19 shortly after debuting in the Russian Football Premier League on 20 April 1996 for FC Uralmash Yekaterinburg against FC Lokomotiv Nizhny Novgorod, he switched to futsal, winning the 2007–08 UEFA Futsal Cup with MFK Viz-Sinara Yekaterinburg.

References

1976 births
Sportspeople from Yekaterinburg
Living people
Russian footballers
FC Ural Yekaterinburg players
Russian Premier League players
Russian men's futsal players
Association football forwards